Fui may refer to:

 Bagirmi Fulfulde language, spoken in the Central African Republic
 Fui Vakapuna (born 1984), American football player
 Foundation University, Islamabad, Pakistan

See also
 Fuy (disambiguation)